The 1976 Troy State Trojans football team represented Troy State University (now known as Troy University) as a member of the Gulf South Conference (GSC) during the 1976 NCAA Division II football season. Led by first-year head coach Charlie Bradshaw, the Trojans compiled an overall record of 8–1–1 with a mark of 7–1 in conference play, and finished as GSC champion.

Schedule

References

Troy State
Troy Trojans football seasons
Gulf South Conference football champion seasons
Troy State Trojans football